The Cultural Path (文化のみち, Bunka-no-michi) is located between Naka-ku and Higashi-ku in the centre of Nagoya, Japan. It shows a number of historic buildings that are under heritage protection.

The area was designated in 1999. The area's historic buildings range back from the Edo period to the Meiji era and Taishō era of the 1920s. Included in the list are mansions, government buildings, temples, and shrines. Many of them are registered as Tangible Cultural Property.

List of such historic monuments

Brick and concrete buildings 
 Nagoya City Hall main building, from 1933, Registered Tangible Cultural Property Important Urban Landscape Building
 Aichi Prefectural Government Office, from 1938, Registered Tangible Cultural Property Important Urban Landscape Building
 former Aichi Credit Unions Association hall, from 1933–38, today used as Aichi Prefectural Office Ōtsubashi branch
 former Nagoya Court of Appeal district courthouse, from 1922, designated as an Important Cultural Property, today used as Nagoya City Archives and municipal museum  
 Kinjō Gakuin High School Keikō-kan Auditorium. 1936, Registered Tangible Cultural Property Important Urban Landscape Building
 Nagoya Ceramics Hall, 1932, architectural expressionism Art Deco design by Ichiei Takasu, Important Landscape Building
 Nagoya Municipal Tsutsui Elementary School, 1936, the only remaining pre-war primary school building in the city
 Tokai Gakuen Auditorium, 1931, Registered Tangible Cultural Property Important Urban Landscape Building
 former mansion of Nagoya mayor Toranosuke Okita, from 1920, today used as Aichi Prefecture Lawmakers Hall

Wooden buildings 
 Kenchū-ji, from 1651, Registered Tangible Cultural Property, Designated Prefectural Cultural Property, Designated Cultural Property and Important Urban Landscape Building
 Sadaso-in, from 1608, built under Tokugawa Yoshimichi
 old Toyoda family house wall (Risaburo Toyoda Teiato), from 1918, Important Urban landscape Building with remaining gate and fence
 old restaurant - Camphor, Taishō era, Important Urban landscape Building
 former Nakai Onorejiro House, from 1911, today used as a restaurant
 former Tetsujiro Haruta House, from 1925, Important Traditional Building and Landscape Structure, European-style building of Design and Preservation
 former Sasuke Toyoda House, from 1923, Sakichi Toyoda's brother, traditional building 
 former Sadayakko Kawakami House from 1920, today Futaba Museum of Culture, Registered Tangible Cultural Property and Important Landscape Building
 former Tamesaburo Imoto House, from 1926, today Shumoku Museum of Culture, Specified Tangible Cultural Heritage, Important Landscape Building, traditional building of townscape preservation district
 former Okaya Sosuke House, from 1920, remaining tearoom, storehouse and garden
 Chikara-machi Nagayamon, from mid-Edo period, remaining gate of Samurai mansion
 Catholic Chikaramachi Church, from 1904, Important Urban Landscape Building, oldest Catholic church in the city
 Omori's Residence, from 1916,	Important Urban Landscape Building
 Ito house, from early Taishō era, Important Urban Landscape Building
 Chokyū-ji, from 1610, temple

Museums 
 Nagoya Castle
 Tokugawa Art Museum, from 1935, museum exhibiting treasure of the Tokugawa Owari lords
 Hōsa Library, from 1950, public library from the collection of the Owari Tokugawa family
 Rakushi Museum, from 1987, exhibition with a focus on MatsuHana hall in the Edo era and tea utensils
 Hori Museum, from 2006, Setsuko Migishi, Yuzo Saeki, Foujita Fujita, Ryuzaburo Umehara exhibited works
 Bank of Tokyo-Mitsubishi UFJ Currency Museum, moved in spring of 2009 to the present location, opened in 1961 as the "Tokai Bank Money Museum"

Other 
 Tokugawa Garden, gardens of the Tokugawa mansion around the Tokugawa museum
 Sannomaru garden, from 1881, relocated the part of the Nagoya Castle Ninomaru Gardens, including the former army officers club Kaikosha Nantei fortification
 Nanao Shrine, founded in early 16th century, Owari clan chief retainer Naruse family 
 Akatsuka Shinmeisha, reconstructed under Tokugawa Yoshinao in 1619 (Kanei 5), some remaining buildings that survived the war
 Crescent mound, from 1743, Basho Matsuo fifty years death anniversary monument

External links 

 Nagoya International Center | Nagoya’s Cultural Path
 Tourism Aichi | Cultural Path

History of Nagoya
Tourist attractions in Nagoya